The 1983 Congoleum Classic was a men's tennis tournament played on outdoor hard courts. It was the 10th edition of the Indian Wells Masters and was part of the 1983 Volvo Grand Prix. It was played at the La Quinta Resort and Club in La Quinta, California in the United States from February 21 through February 28, 1983. Third-seeded José Higueras won the singles title.

Finals

Singles

 José Higueras defeated  Eliot Teltscher 6–4, 6–2
 It was Higueras' 1st title of the year and the 15th of his career.

Doubles

 Brian Gottfried /  Raúl Ramírez defeated  Tian Viljoen /  Danie Visser 6–3, 6–3
 It was Gottfried's 1st title of the year and the 76th of his career. It was Ramirez's 1st title of the year and the 78th of his career.

References

External links
 
 Association of Tennis Professionals (ATP) tournament profile

 
1983 Congoleum Classic
Congoleum Classic
Congoleum Classic
Congoleum Classic
Congoleum Classic